Runaway, Runaways or Run Away may refer to:

Engineering
 Runaway reaction, a chemical reaction releasing more heat than what can be removed and becoming uncontrollable
 Thermal runaway, self-increase of the reaction rate of an exothermic process while temperature increases with the heat released and giving rise to an explosion

 Chain reaction, chemical, or nuclear, reaction giving rise to an exponential propagation with catastrophic consequences
 Diesel engine runaway, the impossibility to turn off a diesel engine fueled by an excess of its own lubricating oil

Films
 The Runaway (1917 film), an American film starring Julia Sanderson
 The Runaway (1926 film), an American film starring Warner Baxter
 Runaway (1958 film) (Bari Theke Paliye), a Bengali film  by Ritwik Ghatak
 The Runaway (1961), an American film starring Cesar Romero
 The Runaway (1964), a British film by Tony Young
 Runaway (1964 film), a New Zealand film by John O'Shea
 The Runaway (1966 film), an Australian TV play
 Runaway! (1973 film), a TV film
 The Runaways (1975 film), an American made-for-television drama film
 Runaway (1984 American film), a science fiction action film starring Tom Selleck and Gene Simmons
 Runaway (1984 North Korean film), a drama film by Shin Sang-ok
 Runaway, an American TV film starring Jasmine Guy
 Runaway (1995 film), a South Korean film
 The Runaway (2000), a TV film in the Hallmark Hall of Fame
 Runaway (2001 film), a Hong Kong film
 The Runaway (2004 film), a German short film
 Runaway (2005 film), a film starring Aaron Stanford and Robin Tunney
 Runaway (2009 film), an animated short by Cordell Barker
 Runaway (2010 film), a musical film starring Kanye West
 The Runaways (2010 film), a film about the 1970s band The Runaways
 Runaway (2013 film) or Udhao, a Bangladeshi film by Amit Ashraf
 The Runaways (2018 film), a British film

Literature
 "The Runaway" (short story), an 1887 short story by Anton Chekhov
 The Runaway (play), a 1776 play by Hannah Cowley
 Runaway (book), a 2004 collection of short stories by Alice Munro
 The Runaways (novel), a 1987 novel by Ruth Thomas
 Tom Clancy's Net Force Explorers: Runaways, a 2001 novel in Tom Clancy's Net Force Explorers series
 Runaways, a 1999 novel by V. C. Andrews
 Runaway, a 2010 novel by Meg Cabot
 The Runaways, a 1972 novel in the Smiler Trilogy by Victor Canning
 The Runaway, a 1997 novel by Martina Cole
 The Runaway, a short poem by Robert Frost
 Runaway, a 2015 novel by Peter May
 Runaway, a 2006 novel by Wendelin Van Draanen
 The Runaway, a 1911 Broadway play starring Billie Burke

Comics
 Runaways (comics), a comic book series by Marvel Comics that began in 2003
 Runaway (Amalgam Comics), a fictional comic book character from 1996
 Runaway, a masked vigilante from the comic book series Batman: Gotham Knights – Gilded City

Music

Groups
 The Runaways, a 1970s American all-female rock band
 The Runaways, a team of producers-songwriters led by Sam Watters
 Bill Kenwright and the Runaways, a 1960s UK band led by Bill Kenwright

Albums
 Runaway (Jim Carroll album) (2000) or its title song
 Runaway (Bill Champlin album) (1981)
 Runaway (Carola Häggkvist album) (1986) or its title song "The Runaway"
 The Runaway (album), a 2010 album by the Magic Numbers
 Runaway (Passenger album) (2018)
 The Runaways (album), a 1976 album by the Runaways
 Runaway (Solution album) (1982) or its title song "Run Away"
 Run Away, a 1995 album by Robert Aaron
 Runaway, a 1984 album by Dakota
 Runaway, an album by Petia or its title song

Songs
 "Runaway" (Aurora song) (2015)
 "Runaway" (Bon Jovi song) (1984)
 "Runaway" (Boomkat song) (2008)
 "Runaway" (The Corrs song) (1995)
 "Runaway" (Deee-Lite song) (1992)
 "Runaway" (Del Shannon song) (1961)
 "Runaway" (Devlin song) (2010)
 "Runaways" (Eclipse song) (2016)
 "Runaway" (Ed Sheeran song) (2014)
 "Runaway" (E'voke song) (1995)
 "Runaway (U & I)", a 2014 song by Galantis
 "Runaway" (Groove Coverage song) (2004)
 "Runaway" (iiO song) (2004)
 "Runaway" (Janet Jackson song) (1995)
 "Runaway" (Jamiroquai song) (2006)
 "Runaway" (Jefferson Starship song) (1978)
 "Runaways" (The Killers song), 2012
 "Runaway" (Linkin Park song) (2000)
 "Run Away" (Live song), from Birds of Pray (2003)
 "Runaway" (Love and Theft song) (2009)
 "Run Away (I Wanna Be with U)", a 2001 song by Nivea featuring Pusha T
 "Runaway" (Nuyorican Soul song) (1996)
 "Run Away" (Real McCoy song) (1994)
 "Runaway" (Sahlene song) (2002)
 "Run Away" (Salsoul Orchestra song), with vocals by Loleatta Holloway (2001)
 "Runaway" (Status Quo song) (1979)
 "Run Away" (SunStroke Project and Olia Tira song) (2010)
 "Run-Away" (Super Furry Animals song) (2007)
 "Runaway" (Tohoshinki song) (2008)
 "Runaway" (Kanye West song) (2010)
 "Runaway" (Sebastián Yatra, Daddy Yankee and Natti Natasha song) (2019)
 "Runaway", a 2010 song by the Afters from Light Up the Sky
 "Runaway", a 2016 song by Against the Current from In Our Bones
 "Runaway", a 2015 song by Ziggy Alberts from Four Feet in the Forest
 "Runaways", a 2015 song by All Time Low from Future Hearts
 "The Runaways", a 2005 song by Anberlin from Never Take Friendship Personal
 "The Runaway", a 1979 song by Elkie Brooks from Live and Learn
 "Runaways", a 2008 song by Brother Firetribe from Heart Full of Fire
 "Runaway", a 1981 song by Bill Conti from the soundtrack For Your Eyes Only
 "Run Away", a 2006 song by Bubba Sparxxx from The Charm
 "Runaway", a 2005 song by Cartel from Chroma
 "Runaway", a 2007 song by Cascada from Perfect Day
 "Runaway", a 1998 song by Cher from Believe
 "Runaway", a 2013 song by J. Cole from Born Sinner
 "Runaway", a 2015 song by Coldrain from Vena
 "Runaway", a 2011 song by Converge from Converge / Dropdead
 "Runaway", a 1990 song by Damn Yankees from Damn Yankees
 "Runaway", a 2008 song by Dukes of Windsor from Minus
 "Run Away", a 2017 song by Dvsn from Morning After
 "Runaway", a 1980 song by Eruption
 "Runaways", a 2016 song by Sam Feldt and Deepend featuring Teemu
 "Runaway", a 2007 song by Nelly Furtado, B-side of the single "Te Busqué"
 "The Runaway", a 1973 song by Gentle Giant from In a Glass House
 "Run Away", a 1986 song by Great White from Shot in the Dark
 "Runaway", a 2010 song by Hail the Villain from Population: Declining
 "Run Away!", a 2005 song by Eric Idle from the musical Spamalot
 "Run Away", a 2011 song by Sarah Jarosz from Follow Me Down
 "Runaways", a 2016 song by Carly Rae Jepsen from the film Ballerina
 "Runaway", a 2013 song by Kara from Full Bloom
 "Runaway", a 2020 song by Nao Kawamura featuring Wouter Hamel
 "Runaway", a 2011 song by Mat Kearney from the soundtrack to Soul Surfer
 "Runaway", a 2011 song by the Kooks from Junk of the Heart
 "Runaway", a 2008 song by Ladytron from Velocifero
 "Runaway", a 2007 song by Avril Lavigne from The Best Damn Thing
 "Runaway", a 2010 song by Maroon 5 from Hands All Over
 "Runaway", a 2012 song by Mumzy Stranger from Tiffin Beats
 "Runaway", a 2010 song by the National from High Violet
 "Run Away (The Escape Song)", a 1990 song by Oingo Boingo from Dark at the End of the Tunnel
 "Runaway", a 2012 song by Olly Murs from Right Place Right Time
 "Runaway", a 2014 song by Parachute Youth
 "Runaway", a 2000 song by Pat McGee Band from Shine
 "Runaway", a 2006 song by Pink from I'm Not Dead
 "Runnaway", a 2009 song by the Plastiscines from About Love
 "Runaways", a 1988 song by Pseudo Echo from Race
 "Runaway", a 2002 song by Red Hot Chili Peppers from By the Way
 "Runaway", a 1990 song by Riot from The Privilege of Power
 "Runaway (Smalltown Boy)", a 2015 song by Kate Ryan
 "Runaway", a 2008 song by Jay Sean from My Own Way
"Run Away", a 2019 song by Teen Top from Dear. N9ne
 "Runaway '67", a 2006 song by Del Shannon from Home and Away
 "Run Away", a 2015 song by Snoop Dogg from Bush
 "Run-A-Way", a 1996 song by the Soundlovers, also covered by Yasmin K.
 "Run Away", a 2005 song by Staind from Chapter V
"Run Away", a 2019 song by In2It
 "Runaways", a 1992 song by Ringo Starr from Time Takes Time
 "Run Away", a 1982 song by 10cc from Ten Out of 10
 "Runaway", a 2008 song by 3 Doors Down from 3 Doors Down
 "Runaway", a 2003 song by Thriving Ivory from Thriving Ivory
 "Runaway", a 2012 song by the Vaccines from Come of Age
"Runaway", a 2019 song by Eric Nam
 "Run Away", a 2010 song by Weezer from Hurley
 "Runaway", a 1976 song by Wishbone Ash from New England
 "Runaway", a 1996 song by Richard Wright from Broken China
 "Runaways", a 1982 song by XTC from English Settlement
 "Runaway", a 2009 song by Yeah Yeah Yeahs from It's Blitz!
 "Runaway", a 2008 song by Darin Zanyar from Flashback
"Run Away", a 2019 song by Got7 from Call My Name 
"Runaway", a 2017 song by Pentagon from Demo_02
"Runaway", a 2017 song by Bobby from Love and Fall
"Runaway", a 2013 song by Shinee from Dream Girl – The Misconceptions of You
"Runaway", a 2020 song by Kang Daniel featuring Yumdda from Magenta
"Runaway", a 2013 song by G-Dragon from Coup d'Etat

Musicals
 Runaways (musical), a 1978 Broadway musical by Elizabeth Swados
 The Runaways (musical), a 1903 Broadway production

Television

Series and specials 
 Runaway (2006 TV series), an American drama television series about a family fleeing from a murderer and the authorities
 Runaway (TV serial), a 2009 British drama television miniseries about a boy who runs away from home
 Runaways (TV series) or Marvel's Runaways, a 2017-2019 TV series set in the Marvel Cinematic Universe about youths running away from their parents, who run an organized crime ring
 The Runaway (TV series), a 2011 British television drama series based on the novel by Martina Cole
 The Runaways (TV series), a 1978-1979 American series about a psychologist trying to help troubled teens,  produced by Quinn Martin

Episodes 
 "Runaway" (The Adventures of Black Beauty), 1972
 "Runaway" (The Brak Show), 2002
 "Runaway" (Dexter: New Blood), 2021
 "Runaway" (Star Trek: Short Treks), 2018
 "The Runaway" (Avatar: The Last Airbender), 2007
 "The Runaway" (Lassie), 1957
 "The Runaway" (Thomas & Friends), 1986
 "Runaways" (Gargoyles), 1996
 "Runaways" (House), 2012
 "The Runaways" (Mad Men), 2014

Places
 Runaway Beach, near Saint John's in Antigua and Barbuda
 Runaway Hills, Victoria Land, Antarctica
 Runaway Island, Graham Land, Antarctica
 Runaway Pond, Glover, Vermont, formerly a lake, now a marsh

Other uses
 Runaway (dependent), a minor who has left home without permission
 The Runaway (ballet), a 2018 ballet by Kyle Abraham
 Runaway: A Road Adventure, a 2001 graphical adventure computer game
 RunAway, a South Korean esports team competing in Overwatch Contenders
 Fugitive, or runaway, a person who is fleeing from custody
 Runaway, a bolting horse
 The Runaway, a painting by Norman Rockwell
 Runaway, a sloop designed and sailed by Bruce Kirby
 "Runaways" (beguny), a minor denomination within Old Believers

See also
 "Run Away with Me", a 2015 song by Carly Rae Jepsen
 Runaway Train (disambiguation)
 Runaway truck ramp
 "Running Away", a 2002 single by Hoobastank
 Runway (disambiguation)